Puya aequatorialis is a species of plant in the family Bromeliaceae. It is endemic to Ecuador.  Its natural habitats are subtropical or tropical dry forests and subtropical or tropical dry shrubland. It is threatened by habitat loss. There is little information known about this species.

References

Flora of Ecuador
aequatorialis
Least concern plants
Taxonomy articles created by Polbot
Taxa named by Édouard André